Michael Joseph Cullerton (born 25 November 1948) is a Scottish former footballer. He is noted for his two spells with Port Vale, as well as for being Stafford Rangers' star forward as they were one of the elite non-league clubs in the 1970s. He later worked behind the scenes at Port Vale and Stoke City, and commentated for BBC Radio Stoke.

Career
Cullerton played for Scotland under-16s, where he impressed Jock Stein, and won a trial at Chelsea. However, he joined Port Vale in October 1965, with the promise of first team football. He made his debut on 12 January 1966, playing in a front-line of five teenagers (the others being Alex Donald, Roddy Georgeson, Paul Bannister, and Paul Ogden). By November 1966 he had become a regular in the first team and was the 1966–67 season as the club's top scorer with 12 goals. On 22 August 1967, he scored a hat-trick in a 3–0 win over Chester in the League Cup, only to hand in a transfer request to manager Stanley Matthews the following month. He remained at the club however, and scored another hat-trick in a 4–2 win over Swansea Town on 20 April 1968. Of an outspoken nature, he lost his first team place after vocally criticizing manager Gordon Lee in the dressing room. He was loaned out to Chester in March 1969, moving there for free in May of that year.

He signed with Brian Clough's Derby County, though never made an appearance for the club despite hitting more than eighty goals for the reserve team. He went into the non-leagues with Eastwood and Stafford Rangers. With Rangers he lifted the FA Trophy in 1972, after he scored one of the goals in a 3–0 win over Barnet at Wembley Stadium. He returned to Vale Park for a £5,000 fee in June 1975, having impressed manager Roy Sproson with his tally of 40 goals for Rangers in the 1974–75 campaign. The money went towards a new toilet block at Marston Road.

He marked the home debut of his second spell by scoring a hat-trick past Hereford United in the League Cup. With 21 goals he became the club's top scorer of the 1975–76 season, but severed a cartilage in September 1976, an injury which put him out of action for five months. He was given a free transfer to Northwich Victoria in May 1978 and later re-signed with Stafford Rangers. He again helped Rangers to FA Trophy success in 1979, when Stafford beat Kettering Town 2–0. He also helped the club to the Northern Premier League title, the Bob Lord Trophy, and numerous lengthy FA Cup runs.

Style of play
Cullerton was a goalscorer with excellent finishing skills, able to curve the ball past goalkeepers with ease. He was notorious for refusing to help out in defence though, and gave very little effort in training, which led to him being criticized for being 'idle'. He was also an extremely reliable penalty taker.

Personal and later life
After working as the commercial manager for Vale between 1982 and 1985, he took up the same post at Stoke City and then Stafford Rangers. He later worked as a commentator for BBC Radio Stoke.

He has two children: Jamie, a former captain of Leek Cricket Club and vice chairman/assistant manager of Leek CSOB; and Anna, a teacher.

Career statistics
Source:

A.  The "Other" column constitutes appearances and goals in the League Cup, Football League Trophy, Football League play-offs and Full Members Cup.

Honours
Stafford Rangers
FA Trophy: 1972 & 1979

References

1948 births
Living people
Footballers from Edinburgh
Scottish footballers
Scotland youth international footballers
Association football forwards
Port Vale F.C. players
Chester City F.C. players
Derby County F.C. players
Eastwood Hanley F.C. players
Stafford Rangers F.C. players
Northwich Victoria F.C. players
English Football League players
Northern Premier League players
Scottish association football commentators
Association football coaches
Port Vale F.C. non-playing staff
Stoke City F.C. non-playing staff